Ermakia (& ) is a small town located in the Agia Paraskevi municipal unit, northern Kozani regional unit, in the Greek region of Macedonia.

References

Populated places in Kozani (regional unit)